The 2013 Youngstown State Penguins football team represented Youngstown State University in the 2013 NCAA Division I FCS football season. They were led by fourth-year head coach Eric Wolford and played their home games at Stambaugh Stadium. They were a member of the Missouri Valley Football Conference. They finished the season 8–4, 5–3 in MVFC play to finish in a four way tie for second place. They were not invited to the FCS Playoffs.

Schedule

Source: Schedule
^Game aired on a tape delayed basis

Ranking movements

References

Youngstown State
Youngstown State Penguins football seasons
Youngstown State Penguins football